Barry Francis Jenner (January 14, 1941 – August 9, 2016) was an American actor.

Early life
Jenner was born January 14, 1941, in Philadelphia, Pennsylvania. He began acting during his college years at West Chester University, in Pennsylvania. After graduation, Jenner moved to New York City where he found roles in Club Champion’s Widow, opposite Maureen Stapleton, and Put Them All Together with Mariette Hartley. Along with Olympia Dukakis, he was a founding member of the innovative Whole Theatre Company where he starred opposite Dukakis in Long Day’s Journey Into Night. Jenner also received wide acclaim as the self-destructive pitcher in Jonathan Reynolds' hit play, Yanks 3, Detroit 0, Top of the Seventh, directed by Alan Arkin at New York City’s American Place Theatre.

Career
Jenner served as a Los Angeles Police Department reserve officer for 21 years. He had early roles on two daytime programs, as Tony Cooper on Somerset (1974–76) and as Evan Webster on Another World (1976–77), where he was involved with Olive Gordon (Jennifer Leak) in an infamous storyline plot to kill long-time character John Randolph (Michael M. Ryan). In 1981, Jenner appeared in several episodes of Knots Landing as Jeff Cunningham, the ex-husband of Abby Cunningham (Donna Mills). He later had a recurring role as Dr. Jerry Kenderson on Dallas (1984–1986). Also in the 1980s, Jenner was a frequent celebrity guest on the $100,000 Pyramid game show. He is the only celebrity to assist in winning the $100,000 on both the Dick Clark and John Davidson incarnations of the game show. Besides that, Jenner appeared on Super Password with Lindsay Bloom, Abby Dalton and Bert Convy back in 1986. From 1986 to 1991, he appeared on The $100,000 Pyramid.

Jenner made guest appearances in other series such as Good Morning, Miss Bliss, Barnaby Jones, Highway to Heaven, Falcon Crest, Hart to Hart, Matlock, V, Silk Stalkings, and Walker, Texas Ranger. Jenner was best known for his recurring role as Carl Winslow's boss Lt. Lou Murtaugh on Family Matters from 1990-1992. Jenner had  a recurring role on Star Trek: Deep Space Nine as Admiral William Ross, appearing in twelve episodes of the series. From 1996 to 1998, he co-starred in the short-lived sitcom Something So Right. Jenner lent his voice to the video game Star Trek: Deep Space Nine: Dominion Wars. He was a popular figure on the convention circuit.

In a 1999 episode of the animated television series King of the Hill, Jenner is awarded a plot in the Texas State Cemetery for his appearances on Dallas.

Personal life and death
Jenner married Susan Harney on May 23, 1980 and later divorced. Jenner married actress Suzanne Hunt on April 1, 2001. They appeared together in the film Popcorn in 1991 and were together for more than 25 years. Barry and Suzanne had two sons, Ashley and Christian. In films, Jenner played the role of Lieutenant James Bradley in the sci-fi spoof, Popcorn, starring opposite his actress wife, Suzanne. He died on August 9, 2016, at Cedars-Sinai Medical Center in Los Angeles from acute myeloid leukemia at the age of 75.

Filmography

Film

Television

Deep Space Nine appearances

Video games

Videos

References

External links
 
 Barry Jenner at Aveleyman

Male actors from Philadelphia
American male film actors
American male soap opera actors
American male television actors
1941 births
2016 deaths
West Chester University alumni
20th-century American male actors
21st-century American male actors
Deaths from leukemia
Deaths from cancer in California